William M. Nicholson (born November 18th, 1937) is a sound re-recording mixer at NBC Universal studios in Los Angeles, California. During his lengthy career, he has received numerous awards and nominations, including 5 Emmy awards, 22 Emmy nominations, 2 Cinema Audio Society nominations, and an Academy Award nomination for Martin Scorsese's 1980 film Raging Bull. He is also a member of the Academy of Motion Picture Arts and Sciences.

Biography
Nicholson was born in San Antonio, Texas and grew up in McLean County, Illinois. After serving in the Army in post-World War II Europe, he moved to Los Angeles and took a job as a rent boy, eventually working his way up to sound mixer.  After working on feature films for Warner Hollywood Studios, he moved to Todd-AO/Glen Glenn in the early 1980s to do television post-production. In 1998, he began work on Dubbing stage 2 at Universal Studios. While there, aside from many other projects, he has mixed all but three of the shows in Dick Wolf's 18-year-old Law & Order franchise.

After moving away from full-length feature films to work in television, Nicholson's old job was taken by Kevin O'Connell, the person with the most Academy Award nominations (19) without a win.

He currently lives with his wife Barbara in Glendale, California.

Awards and Nominations Cinema Audio Society

Oscars
1980 nomination, Best Sound, Raging Bull

Emmys
1982 Emmy nomination, Outstanding Individual Achievement - Children's Programming, Rascals and Robbers: The Secret Adventures of Tom Sawyer and Huck Finn (1982)
1982 Emmy award, Outstanding Film Sound Mixing for a Series, Hill Street Blues, for episode "Personal Foul"
1983 Emmy award, Outstanding Film Sound Mixing for a Series, Hill Street Blues, for episode "Trial By Fury"
1983 Emmy nomination, Outstanding Film Sound Mixing for a Series, Cagney & Lacey, for episode "Recreational Use"
1983 Emmy nomination, Outstanding Film Sound Mixing for a Series, St. Elsewhere, for episode "The Count"
1984 Emmy award, Outstanding Film Sound Mixing for a Series, Hill Street Blues, for episode "Parting is Such Sweep Sorrow"
1984 Emmy nomination, Outstanding Film Sound Mixing for a Series, Cagney & Lacey, for episode "Bounty Hunter"
1984 Emmy nomination, Outstanding Film Sound Mixing for a Series, Hill Street Blues, for episode "Praise Dilaudid"
1985 Emmy nomination, Outstanding Film Sound Mixing for a Series, St. Elsewhere, for episode "Sweet Dreams"
1985 Emmy nomination, Outstanding Film Sound Mixing for a Series, Hill Street Blues, for episode "Queen For a Day"
1985 Emmy nomination, Outstanding Film Sound Mixing for a Series, Hill Street Blues, for episode "The Rise and Fall of Paul the Wall"
1985 Emmy award, Outstanding Film Sound Mixing for a Series, Cagney & Lacey, for episode "Heat"
1986 Emmy nomination, Outstanding Sound Mixing for a Comedy Series or a Special, Newhart, for episode "Larry's Dead, Long Live Larry"
1986 Emmy award, Outstanding Sound Mixing for a Drama Series, St. Elsewhere, for episode "Iced Coffey"
1986 Emmy nomination, Outstanding Sound Mixing for a Drama Series, Hill Street Blues, for episode "Time Heals, part 2"
1987 Emmy nomination, Outstanding Sound Mixing for a Drama Series, Crime Story, for pilot episode
1987 Emmy nomination, Outstanding Sound Mixing for a Drama Series, Hill Street Blues, for episode "It Ain't Over Till it's Over"
1988 Emmy nomination, Outstanding Sound Mixing for a Dramatic Miniseries or a Special, Foxfire
1997 Emmy nomination, Outstanding Sound Mixing for a Drama Series, Law & Order, for episode "D-Girl"
1999 Emmy nomination, Outstanding Sound Mixing for a Drama Series, Law & Order, for episode "Empire"
2000 Emmy nomination, Outstanding Sound Mixing for a Drama Series, Law & Order, for episode "Gunshow"
2001 Emmy nomination, Outstanding Single Camera Sound Mixing for a Series, Law & Order, for episode "School Daze"
2001 Cinema Audio Society nomination, Outstanding Achievement in Sound Mixing for a Television Series, Law & Order, for episode "Standoff"
2002 Cinema Audio Society nomination, Outstanding Sound Mixing for Television - Series, Law & Order, for episode "Soldier of Fortune"

List of films and television shows worked on http://www.filmmakersdestination.com/published/9.pdf filmmakersdestination.com
[incomplete listing]

Films
Being There (1979)
Smokey and the Bandit II (1980)
The Island (1980)
Xanadu (1980)
Raging Bull (1980)
Inside Moves (1980)
The Cannonball Run (1981)
Southern Comfort (1981)
Sharky's Machine (1981)
Death Valley (1982)
Jetsons: The Movie (1990)
A Guy Walks into a Bar (1997)

Television series
Hill Street Blues
St. Elsewhere
Cagney & Lacey
Remington Steele
Bay City Blues
Beverly Hills Cop
Father Dowling Mysteries
Jake and The Fatman
Murder She Wrote
Diagnosis Murder
Miami Vice
Seaquest
Nasty Boys
New York Undercover
Law & Order
Law & Order: Special Victims Unit
Law & Order: Criminal Intent
Law & Order: Trial by Jury
Law & Order: Crime & Punishment
Conviction
Lipstick Jungle

Television films
Rascals & Robbers: The Secret Adventures of Tom Sawyer & Huck Finn (1982)
The Lightship (1986)
Perry Mason: The Case of the All-Star Assassin (1989)
Perry Mason: The Case of the Poisoned Pen (1990)
Perry Mason: The Case of the Desperate Deception (1990)
Perry Mason: The Case of the Reckless Romeo (1992)
Perry Mason: The Case of the Heartbroken Bride (1992)
Ladykiller (1992)
In the Company of Darkness (1993)
Blindsided (1993)
Perry Mason: The Case of the Skin-Deep Scandal (1993)
For the Love of My Child: The Alissa Ayala Story (1993)
Caught in the Act (1993)
The Disappearance of Christina (1993)
Children of the Mist (1993)
Perry Mason: The Case of the Telltale Talk Show Host (1993)
Perry Mason: The Case of the Killer Kiss (1993)
The Haunting of Seacliff Inn (1994)
A Perry Mason Mystery: The Case of the Lethal Lifestyle (1994)
Perry Mason: The Case of the Skin-Deep Scandal (1994)
Don't Talk to Strangers (1994)
Out of Annie's Past (1995)
A Perry Mason Mystery: The Case of the Jealous Jokester (1995)
Evil Has a Face (1996)
Exiled (1998)
Haley Wagner, Star (1999)
Horse Sense (1999)

References

External links
Oscar nomination

List of nominations and awards
Page at filmmakersdestination.com
Page at hollywood.com

1937 births
Living people
Emmy Award winners
People from Glendale, California